Dolichocephala austriaca is a species of dance fly, in the fly family Empididae.

References

Empididae
Insects described in 1968
Diptera of Europe